Sofia Lind, (born 4 September 1975), is a Swedish cross-country skier. She won the women's race at the Vasaloppet four times, in 1997, 1999, 2004 and 2005. She also had the best time among the women in 1996, but prior to 1997, there was no official women's championship.

Cross-country skiing results
All results are sourced from the International Ski Federation (FIS).

World Cup

Season standings

References

External links
FIS-Ski Biography - Sofia Lind

1975 births
Swedish female cross-country skiers
Vasaloppet winners
Living people
Åsarna IK skiers
21st-century Swedish women